Cock-a-Doodle Doo is a 1939 picture book by Berta and Elmer Hader. The story is about a rooster who has been raised by ducks and decides to try and find others like him. The book was a recipient of a 1940 Caldecott Honor for its illustrations.

References

1939 children's books
American picture books
Caldecott Honor-winning works